Fathima Babu is a South Indian actress, former newsreader and socialite based out of Chennai who hails from Puducherry. Born in a Muslim family, Fathima began her public career as a newsreader for more than 25 years with DD Podhigai, the Tamil version of Doordarshan news, and later worked for Jaya TV. She later converted to Hinduism for her husband. She subsequently moved on to work in television serials, films and theatre performances, operating in the Tamil and Malayalam languages.

Career
Fathima became a newsreader with DD Podhigai, the Tamil version of Doordarshan, in the late 1980s. In 1989, she briefly went missing causing much speculation as to her disappearance. Several years later, Fathima clarified that during the period she was missing, she was filming for a television serial known as Chithirapaavai and did not want to breach Doordarshan's rule of news anchors not being able to work in serials.

Fathima made her film debut through K. Balachander's feminist film Kalki (1996), where she starred alongside an ensemble cast of Shruti, Rahman, Prakash Raj, Geetha, and Renuka. The film garnered positive reviews, with a film critic noting that Fathima "has an impressive debut, performing with confidence". Fathima moved on to play supporting roles in films, often portraying the mother of the lead characters.

Fathima started her own drama production group, Fab's Theatre, which performs shows in Chennai. She was initially introduced to theatre by K. Balachander, who often helped her work on and develop scripts. The group has made shows such as Sethu Vandirikkaen and Thaarama Tallyaa directed by Fathima, which opened in February 2016. She was also briefly involved in politics, and campaigned for the AIADMK on behalf of Jayalalithaa, and eventually took up a role as a spokesperson of the party. After Jayalalithaa's death, Fathima joined O. Paneerselvam's team, before ultimately distancing herself from politics. In 2019, she appeared in the reality television show Bigg Boss Tamil 3 on Star Vijay, and was the first contestant to be evicted.

Films

Tamil

Malayalam

Telugu

Dramas

Television

References

External links
 

Living people
Indian film actresses
Indian Tamil people
Actresses in Tamil cinema
Actresses in Malayalam cinema
20th-century Indian actresses
21st-century Indian actresses
People from Madurai district
Actresses from Tamil Nadu
Bigg Boss (Tamil TV series) contestants
Actresses in Malayalam television
Actresses in Tamil television
Actresses in Telugu television
Actresses in Telugu cinema
Year of birth missing (living people)